Anna-Lisa Berglund (18 January 1935 – 3 June 2019) was a Swedish archer who competed at three Olympic Games in archery for Sweden.

Career 

Berglund held two world records at the 30m distance.

In 1971 she became the 23rd Swedish archer to receive a Storr Grabb award.

She participated in the women's individual event at the 1972, 1976 and the 1980 Olympic Games finishing 34th, 11th and 16th respectively.

References

External links 
 Profile on worldarchery.org

1935 births
2019 deaths
Swedish female archers
Olympic archers of Sweden
Archers at the 1972 Summer Olympics
Archers at the 1976 Summer Olympics
Archers at the 1980 Summer Olympics
20th-century Swedish women